Jimmy Kelly was an early twentieth-century Irish football inside forward who played professionally in Northern Ireland, Scotland, Canada and the United States.

Career
Kelly played for Northern Ireland club Bangor F.C. of the now defunct Intermediate League, but was transferred to St Johnstone F.C. of the Scottish Football League in 1922. At some point, he left Britain for Canada where he played for Toronto Ulster. In 1926, he moved south to sign with the Fall River Marksmen of the American Soccer League. In 1927, Kelly scored one of Fall River's seven goals in their romp over Holley Carburetor F.C. in the 1927 National Challenge Cup final. In 1928, he left the ASL.

References

Association footballers from Northern Ireland
Bangor F.C. players
St Johnstone F.C. players
American Soccer League (1921–1933) players
Fall River Marksmen players
Toronto Ulster United players
Year of birth missing
Year of death missing
Canadian National Soccer League players
Association football forwards